Oswaldo is an original animated series from the production company Birdo Studio. The series was created by Pedro Eboli and premiered on October 11, 2017 on Cartoon Network and on October 29, 2017 on TV Cultura. On February 7, 2018, it was announced the show had been renewed for a 13-episode second season starting June 3, 2019. The series was renewed for a third season, which premiered on January 6, 2020. The series concluded with the fourth season, which premiered on November 4th, 2020 and ended on January 27, 2021.

Series overview

Episodes

Season 1 (2017–18)

Season 2 (2019)

Season 3 (2020)

Season 4 (2020-21)

References 

Lists of animated television series episodes
Lists of Brazilian television series episodes